Vartanoush Garbis Selim (born March 9, 1960), better known by her stage name Anoushka, is an Egyptian singer and actress.

Early life
She was born in Cairo, Egypt, to an Egyptian Armenian father and an Armenian mother. She had her secondary school education in the Armenian Gulbenkian School in Boulaq neighborhood in Cairo and continued to study Business Administration at American University of Cairo. After graduation she worked in a foreign investment company and later on in the advertising firm Tarek Nour as a singer on advertisements.

Career 
She took in an international song competition organized by International Federation of Festival Organizations (FIDOF) singing an original French song, lyrics by Gamal Abdel Halim Hasan and music by Kamel Cherif. Her first Egyptian public song was in a children's television program teaching Arabic language directed by Fehmi Abdel Hamid. She went on to take part in 1987 and 1988 in international festivals in Finland, Czechoslovakia, Bulgaria, Turkey, France and Latin America. In Turkey, she won first prize with "Habbytak" and in the Francophonie competitions in France with her own composition "Ya Habibi (Oh my Love)" in French and "Ya Leyl (Oh Night)" also in French composed by Midhat el Khawla.

She went on to release many albums in Arabic becoming a pan-Arab sensation and was awarded by the Egyptian Minister of Tourism for her efforts in promoting Egyptian music in the Arab World and worldwide. She also took part in many national, pan-Arab and international music events.

She had the lead role in an operetta entitled "El Ward we Fosoulu" (in Egyptian Arabic "الورد وفصوله") in the Children Day festivities. She is a prolific actress, rose to fame most notably in "El-Tawous" (in Egyptian Arabic "الطاووس") with the prominent movie star Salah Zulfikar in 1991. Afterwards, the prominent film director Salah Abu Seif chose her to participate in the movie "Al-Sayed Kaf" (in Egyptian Arabic "السيد كاف"), then her acting works continued including "Qanoon Al-Maraghi" (in Egyptian Arabic "قانون المراغي") among others.

Discography
Habbaytak Egyptian Arabic حبيتك
Nadani Egyptian Arabic ناداني
Tigi Tghanni Egyptian Arabic تيجي تغنّي
Abayyan Zayn Egyptian Arabic أبيّن زين
Keddab Egyptian Arabic كدّاب

Filmography
Anoushka has also played roles in many Egyptian films including:
Es Sayyed Kaf Egyptian Arabic السيد كاف, directed by the Egyptian film director Salah Abu Seif
Man Atlaqa Haazihi el Rousasa? Arabic من أطلق هذه الرصاصة
"Hepta هبتا”

TV Shows 
She has played roles in many Egyptian TV Shows including:
 El Tawous الطاووس 
 El Marsa wa El Bahar المرسى و البحار 
 Qanoun Al Maraghi قانون المراغي 
 Ferquet Nagui Atallah فرقة ناجي عطالله 
 El Sayeda El Oula السيدة الاولى 
 Saraya Abdeen سرايا عابدين 
 Mamlakat Youssef Al Maghraby مملكة يوسف المغربي 
 Grand Hotel جراند اوتيل 
 Sokut Horr سقوط حر 
 Halawat El Donia حلاوة الدنيا

References

1960 births
Living people
Singers from Cairo
20th-century Egyptian women singers
Egyptian film actresses
Egyptian television actresses
Singers who perform in Egyptian Arabic
Egyptian Christians
Egyptian people of Armenian descent
21st-century Egyptian women singers